The Ministry of Health is a department of the Government of British Columbia which oversees the provincial healthcare system. It manages services including the Medical Services Plan, HealthLinkBC, and the PharmaCare program.

The majority of health services are delivered through partnerships with health authorities, physicians and other health professionals. The ministry works with five regional health authorities (Fraser Health, Interior Health, Island Health, Northern Health and Vancouver Coastal Health) and one province-wide health authority (the Provincial Health Services Authority), which is responsible for specialized health services. It also supports the role of the provincial health officer, whose office is house within the ministry.

Adrian Dix has been Minister of Health since June 18, 2017.

History 
On February 21, 1946, the government announced plans to establish a separate department for health; until then, health policy had been the purview of the provincial secretary. The Department of Health and Welfare was formally established on October 1, 1946, with George Pearson as the inaugural minister.

During the first term of the Gordon Campbell government, a separate Ministry of Health Planning was created (led by Sindi Hawkins) but that ministry was later merged back into the main ministry. During the same period, there were also two ministers of State: one for seniors and another for mental health and addictions.

List of ministers

Health activities 
On April 30, 2020, the Ministry published guidance alongside the BC Centre for Disease Control on interpreting the results of polymerase chain reaction (PCR) tests for detection of SARS-CoV-2, the virus that causes COVID-19.

See also
E-Comm, 9-1-1 call and dispatch centre for Southwestern BC

References

External links 
 

British Columbia government departments and agencies
Medical and health organizations based in British Columbia
British Columbia